Pau Sabater i Lliró (5 March 1884 in Algerri, province of Lleida – 17 July 1919 in Barcelona) was a Spanish anarcho-syndicalist in the  Confederación Nacional del Trabajo in Catalonia. He was known also as "el Tero". He was secretary of the Union of Dyers, one of the most powerful trade unions of the textile industry. His partner was Josepa Ros, with whom he had three children. He was killed by members of the gang of Manuel Bravo Portillo. The murder of Manuel Bravo Portillo himself a few months later was interpreted as a revenge from unionists. His funeral on 24 July 1919 was a huge demonstration of workers, with numerous riots across the entire Barcelona from the hospital to the cemetery at Montjuich. The trial for his murder, full of irregularities, took place on 10 and 11 May 1922; the only defendant, Luis Garcia Fernandez, was acquitted.

References

Bibliography
Casal Gómez, Manuel. La Banda Negra. El orígen y la actuación de los pistoleros en Barcelona (1918-1921). Icarial Editorial. Barcelona, 1977. 
Vidal y Planas, Alfonso. Bombas de Odio. Mundo Latino. Madrid, no date (may be 1931-1932).
Madrid, Francisco. Ocho meses y un dia en el Gobierno Civil de Barcelona. Ediciones de La Flecha. Barcelona-Madrid, 1932.

1884 births
1919 deaths
People from Noguera (comarca)
Anarcho-syndicalists
Murdered anarchists
Spanish anarchists
Confederación Nacional del Trabajo members